Blagoveshchenye is a rural locality (a village) and the administrative center of Mardengskoye Rural Settlement, Velikoustyugsky District, Vologda Oblast, Russia. The population was 474 as of 2002. There are 14 streets.

Geography 
Blagoveshchenye is located 17 km southwest of Veliky Ustyug (the district's administrative centre) by road. Teltevo is the nearest rural locality.

References 

Rural localities in Velikoustyugsky District